The Changeling (取り替え子 (チェンジリング) Torikae ko (Chenjiringu)) is a 2000 novel by Kenzaburō Ōe. It is the first book of a trilogy. A translation into English by Deborah Boliver Boehm, was published in 2010 by Grove Press in the United States and by Atlantic Books in the United Kingdom. Boehm uses American English heavily in her translation.

Plot
In the novel, a filmmaker named Goro Hanawa commits suicide, although he had appeared to be happy. His best friend, a novelist named Kogito Choko who is also his brother-in-law, discovers the suicide via one of 40 audiotapes that Goro recorded and sent to him. Chikashi Choko, Goro's sister and Kogito's wife, also learns that Goro has died. Kogito listens to the tapes and, in the words of Scott Espositom reviewing the novel in the Los Angeles Times, "What he finds is a rambling series of discourses on everything from the friendship they've shared since they were teens in the 1950s to Goro's ideas about art and life, their shared admiration for Rimbaud and a few secrets from the past."

Characters
 : the main character
 The name "Kogito" is a reference to the phrase Cogito ergo sum coined by Descartes. Kogito is based on Kenzaburō Ōe himself and his son is based on Ōe's son Hikari Ōe.
 : a film director who is Kogito's brother-in-law and best friend
 Goro is based on Juzo Itami, who was Ōe's brother in law.
 : Goro's sister and Kogito's wife
Daio: the one-armed leader of a band of young right-wingers led by Kogito's father until 1945
Peter: a homosexual U.S. Army officer serving in Japan in 1952
Mitsu Azuma-Böme: an older Japanese woman who seeks Kogito out in Berlin
: Kogito's son, a disabled composer
Akari is based on Oe's son Hikari Oe.
Ura Shima: Goro's teenage lover in Berlin one year before his suicide

Reception
Scott Esposito wrote in the Los Angeles Times that the book "offers evidence that the Japanese master has regained his footing". Christopher Tayler wrote in The Guardian that, because a Western reader may not have context that a Japanese reader would have, it would be more difficult for him or her to get fulfillment from the novel.

References

External links

 Atlantic Books page about the novel.The Changeling – 
 Review of the novel by Chad W. Post in Three Percent, University of Rochester. 
Man Asian Literary Prize – Kenzaburo Oe
 Magill's Literary Annual 2011 The Changeling

2000 Japanese novels
Japanese mystery novels
Novels by Kenzaburō Ōe
Novels set in Japan